Bhatgram Union is a union of Mirzapur Upazila, Tangail District, Bangladesh. It is situated  4 km west of Mirzapur and 32 km southeast of Tangail, the district's headquarters.

Demographics
According to Population Census 2011 performed by the Bangladesh Bureau of Statistics, the total population of Bhatgram Union is 21,869. There are 5,102 households in total.

Education
The literacy rate in Bhatgram Union is 54.5% (Male - 58.9%, Female - 50.6%).

See also
 Union Councils of Tangail District

References

Populated places in Dhaka Division
Populated places in Tangail District
Unions of Mirzapur Upazila